Fat White Family are an English rock band, formed in 2011 in Peckham, South London.

History
The band, fronted by Southampton-born and Cookstown-raised Lias Kaci Saoudi, formed in 2011. Lead guitarist Saul Adamczewski was previously the frontman of indie pop band the Metros, which also featured Fat White Family's bass player, Joe Pancucci.

They released their debut album, Champagne Holocaust, in 2013, on UK label Trashmouth Records. It was released in 2014 in the U.S. on Fat Possum Records. The band released Fat Whites/Taman Shud, a split EP with Taman Shud, on 11 December 2013 on Trashmouth.

On 10 March 2014, Fat White Family issued their first single, "Touch the Leather", on Hate Hate Hate Records.

In early 2014, the band launched a PledgeMusic campaign to fund their show at the South by Southwest festival, with a subsequent US tour. Pledgers were given the self-released EP Crippled B-Sides and Inconsequential Rarities. Next was the single "I Am Mark E Smith" (referencing singer Mark E. Smith of the Fall), released 15 December 2014.

Their second album, Songs for Our Mothers, was released in 2016 by the Without Consent label. Lias Saoudi described the album as an attempt to “really to get at the shittiness lurking in the core of my own soul, and in everybody else's.” It was promoted with a single for "Whitest Boy on the Beach", which was later chosen for the closing credits of the 2017 film T2 Trainspotting.

Fat White Family's next single, "Breaking Into Aldi", was released on 16 August 2016.

On 9 January 2019, Fat White Family announced that their third album, Serfs Up!, would be released on 19 April 2019 on Domino Records. This was followed by the singles "Feet" and "Tastes Good With The Money", the latter featuring spoken lyrics by Baxter Dury, and a video directed by Róisín Murphy. The album was described as "triumphant" and "transcendent" by Adelle Stripe in The Quietus, and The Irish Times said it “feels like a pop album you might slap on as the world is about to end or you’ve just learned Brexit has been pushed back to 2020.”

Ten Thousand Apologies: Fat White Family and the Miracle of Failure, is a recent biography of Fat White Family co-written by Lias Saoudi and Adelle Stripe. Writing in the Observer, Miranda Sawyer described it as 'the story of a band that’s always on the brink: of stardom, of madness, of brilliance, of disgrace.'  It is nominated for the 2023 Penderyn Music Book Prize.

Other projects
In 2015, Adamczewski and Lias Saoudi collaborated with Adrian Flanagan and Dean Honer of experimental band Eccentronic Research Council on their album Johnny Rocket, Narcissist & Music Machine... I'm Your Biggest Fan. After its release, the partnership took concepts from the album to form a new band called the Moonlandingz. The act ended up touring together, as well as working with Sean Lennon, Yoko Ono, Philip Oakey, Randy Jones and Slow Club frontwoman Rebecca Taylor, resulting in the 2017 release of their debut album, Interplanetary Class Classics.

In January 2017, Adamczewski formed the band Insecure Men with Lennon (guitar), Ben Romans-Hopcraft (bass), Jack Everett (drums), Jon Catfish de Lorene (keyboards) and Alex White (saxophone). Lennon co-produced their eponymous debut album, released in February 2018.

Members
Current members
Lias Kaci Saoudi – lead vocals
Saul Adamczewski – guitar, vocals
Nathan Saoudi – keyboards
Adam J. Harmer – guitar
Sam Toms – drums
Adam Brennan – bass
Alex White – saxophone

Former members
Ciaran Hartnett – bass
Jack Everett – drums
Joseph Pancucci-Simpson – bass
Dan Lyons – drums
Jak Payne – bass
Taishi Nagasaka – bass
Severin Black – drums

Temporary members
Chris O.C – drums
Dale Barclay – guitar (d. 2018)
Martin Dean – drums
Mike Brandon – guitar
Mairead O'Connor – guitar, bass
Chris Taylor – guitar
Rob Doyle – bongos

Discography

Studio albums
Champagne Holocaust (Trashmouth/Fat Possum, 2013)
Songs for Our Mothers (Without Consent/Fat Possum, 2016)
Serfs Up! (Domino, 2019)

EPs
Fat Whites/Taman Shud (Trashmouth, 2013)
Crippled B-Sides and Inconsequential Rarities (self-released, 2014)

Singles
"Touch the Leather" (Hate Hate Hate, 2014)
"I Am Mark E Smith" (Without Consent, 2014)
"Whitest Boy on the Beach" (Without Consent, 2016)
"Breaking Into Aldi" (Without Consent, 2016)
"Feet" (Domino, 2019)
"Tastes Good With The Money" (Domino, 2019)

References

External links

 

2011 establishments in the United Kingdom
Musical groups established in 2011
Sibling musical groups
Fat Possum Records artists
People from Peckham
English rock music groups
English experimental musical groups
Musical groups from London
Domino Recording Company artists